Todd E. Liebenstein (born January 9, 1960) is a former American football defensive end who played four seasons in the National Football League (NFL) for the Washington Redskins and started in Super Bowl XVIII. He played college football at the University of Nevada, Las Vegas.

Washington Redskins players
UNLV Rebels football players
People from the Las Vegas Valley
American football defensive linemen
1960 births
Living people
People from Grand Rapids, Michigan